John M. Mugar (April 5, 1914 – March 23, 2007) president and chairman of the Star Market chain of supermarkets in New England and prominent member of the Mugar family of Greater Boston, was born April 5, 1914, in Boston, son of Armenian immigrant, Martin Mugar and his wife Anna (née Chooljian). He died March 23, 2007, in Gloucester.

Education
John Martin Mugar graduated magna cum laude from Tufts University in 1937. He served actively as a Trustee of Tufts from 1966 to 1989 and was a trustee emeritus for the rest of his life. He also served on the board of the Fletcher School of Law and Diplomacy at Tufts.

Early career 

John Mugar was born Zaven Marderos DerMugarditchian in Boston. His ancestors had emigrated to America from Harpoot Turkey near the Euphrates River. His great-grandfather on his mother's side managed an orphanage in Armenia for missionaries of the American Congregational Church. His great-grandfather and twenty five members of his family were killed in the massacres of 1915.

John grew up in the Boston area where his father Martin Mugar and Martin's brothers managed a restaurant on the corner of Washington Street and Massachusetts Avenue in Boston known as Mugar's Cafe.

At the age of thirteen he sold the Saturday Evening Post door to door and eventually managed a sales force of twenty boys, winning sales competitions that Curtis Publishing held in Boston.

During the Depression his father's restaurant closed and the family came on hard times. John put his college plans on hold and took a full-time job working for his cousin Stephen P. Mugar at Star Market.

In 1933 after a year at Star, John returned to school, first doing a post-grad year at Berkeley Prep, where he was valedictorian and then matriculating at Tufts University, where he majored in economics. He graduated magna cum laude in 1937.

That same year he returned to Star, which at the time had three stores. He was appointed treasurer and reduced expenses by 30%. In 1940 he became vice-president.

Naval service in WWII

At the age of 28 John Mugar enlisted in the US Navy. He was assigned to the Portsmouth Naval Shipyard in 1943, where he managed the commissary. It was at Portsmouth that he met his wife Helen Gienandt, who was an ensign in the Navy Nurse Corps. Both were eventually shipped out to the Pacific Front: Helen to New Guinea and John to Okinawa, where he was commissary officer of an amphibious unit, Acorn 44. John finished his career in the Navy with the rank of Senior Lieutenant.

Later career 

As vice- president, president and finally chairman of the board, John Mugar helped take Star Market from a small chain of several stores to a major New England supermarket brand of more than sixty stores. Under his leadership, Star Market was the first to implement many innovations in the supermarket industry, such as unit pricing, meats wrapped in cellophane, in-store banks and florists, as well as installing conveyor belts that carried bags of groceries to a central pickup station at the store parking lot. He also instituted a profit-sharing and retirement program for full and part-time employees.
He instituted programs of work/study for his employees in association with local universities and was particularly interested in encouraging women to assume a greater role in management that was evidenced by his instrumental role in the founding of the Simmons School of Management.

Marriage and family
John M. Mugar married Helen Gienandt whom he met in 1943 at the Portsmouth, New Hampshire Naval Base, where he was a Navy lieutenant and she was a Navy nurse. They had three daughters and a son. John and Helen lived in Belmont for many years before retiring to Marco Island, Florida. Later they returned to Gloucester to live.

References 

1914 births
2007 deaths
People from Greater Boston
American people of Armenian descent
American chairpersons of corporations
American grocers
Tufts University alumni
People from Marco Island, Florida
People from Gloucester, Massachusetts
People from Belmont, Massachusetts